Axia margarita is a moth of the family Cimeliidae first described by Jacob Hübner in 1813. It is found in Morocco, Spain, Portugal, southern France, Istria and southern Carniola.

The wingspan is 22–28 mm. Adults are mainly on wing during the day. There are two generations per year, with adults on wing from April to October.

The larvae feed on various species of spurge (Euphorbia species).

Subspecies
Axia margarita margarita
Axia margarita andalusica (Marten, 1934) (Morocco and Andalusia)

References

External links
 Moths and Butterflies of Europe and North Africa
 
 Lepiforum.de

Cimeliidae
Moths described in 1813
Moths of Africa
Moths of Europe
Taxa named by Jacob Hübner